

Archosauromorphs

Newly named non-avian dinosaurs
Data courtesy of George Olshevsky's dinosaur genera list.

Newly named birds

Plesiosaurs

New taxa

References

 
Paleontology
Paleontology 5